The Civic Museums of Pavia (Musei Civici di Pavia) are a number of museums in Pavia, Lombardy, northern Italy. They are housed in the Castello Visconteo, or Visconti Castle, built in 1360 by Galeazzo II Visconti, soon after taking the city, a free city-state until then. The credited architect is Bartolino da Novara. The castle used to be the main residence of the Visconti family, while the political capital of the state was Milan. North of the castle a wide park was enclosed, also including the Certosa of Pavia, founded 1396 according to a vow of Gian Galeazzo Visconti, meant to be a sort of private chapel of the Visconti dynasty. The Battle of Pavia (1525), climax of the Italian Wars, took place inside the castle park. 
 
The Civic Museums of Pavia include the Pinacoteca Malaspina, Museo Archeologico and Sala Longobarda, Sezioni Medioevale e Rinascimentale Quadreria dell’800 (Collezione Morone), Museo del Risorgimento, Museo Robecchi Bricchetti, and the Cripta di Sant’Eusebio.

History 
The museum was built by the will of the Marquis Luigi Malaspina di Sannazzaro, an enlightened artist (1754/1835), who donated his art collections to the municipality on his death. The collection, which over time was enriched by numerous donations, was initially housed in the Malaspina Palace and was moved to the castle only in 1951.

Collections
The archaeological collection includes materials found by chance during agricultural or building works; the museum has come mainly from private collecting (Giuletti, Reale collection, etc.). The arcades on the ground floor of the castle house the Lapidarium made up of stelae, sarcophagi, funerary and votive altars, epigraphs, capitals, colonnems and Roman milestones.

Archaeological Museum and Longobard Room 

The first room is dedicated to the territory of Ticinum (this was the ancient name of Pavia) in Roman times and, among other finds, it exhibits a sepulchral area, made up of brick cremation tombs and a sepulchral stone, of the 1st century A.D. found in Casteggio. The room also houses the finds from the Celtic necropolis found in 1957 in Santa Cristina e Bissone, whose grave goods date back to the 2nd century B.C. they are characterized by the presence of stylistically traditional celtic objects combined with typically Roman products, such as black-glazed Ware. Not otherwise, the grave goods from the 1st century B.C. tomb found in Pavia it is at the same time Celtic (in the ceramics and brooches) and Roman (in the brick elements of the box and in the clay unguentarium). These are evidence of the progressive penetration of Roman culture into the Celtic Cisalpine world. Also from the same period dates back to a piece of great interest: a silver cup which on the rim bears an inscription formed by a Ligurian name followed by an indication of Roman weight measurements found near Zerbo in a group of "Gallo-Roman" tombs cremation and dated to the 2nd century B.C.

In the second room is exhibited the Egyptian collection, donated by the Marquis Malaspina di Sannazzaro (who bought it from Giuseppe Nizzoli, chancellor of the Austrian consulate in Alexandria between 1818 and 1828), consisting of about 150 artifacts. The Egyptian collection is not the only section of the museum containing materials not coming from the Pavia area: we only remember the collection of Phoenician-Punic ceramics (rarely found in Italian museums outside Sardinia) left by Francesco Reale in 1892 or the collection of Italiot and Greek vases that came to the museum through 19th-century Pavese collectors.

Also in the same room is the collection of Roman glass, probably the most important in northern Italy, in which there are pieces of the highest quality and rarity, such as the dark blue glass kantharos from Frascarolo and the cup of Ennion. the Roman glass in the museum stands out for its quality and typological variety. In the collection, ascribable in the majority of the pieces to the 1st and 2nd century AD, the most diverse processing techniques are testified

Next to the glass, there are some sculptures from the Roman age found in the city and in its territory, among which a Greek marble bust depicting Artemis Soteira of Cephisodotus the Elder, a Roman copy of the 1st-2nd century AD stands out. The III and IV rooms exhibit Roman remains found in Pavia: ceramics, bronzes, terra sigillata, fine table ceramics, other Roman glass and large architectural and sculptural finds, including the statue of a man with a toga, known as name of Muto from the hilt to the neck, dating back to the 1st-2nd century AD. and coming from the western gate of the city (Porta Marenga). Among the sculptures of the Roman age there is also a female portrait, in Greek marble representing a woman of mature age with deeply sunken eyes and hats gathered on the nape of the neck, evidence of the "cultured" sculpture of Pavia of the III century. Also from a sepulchral monument comes a marble stone with the image of Attis, dating back to the 1st century AD. There are Celtic finds from the La Tène period and glazed pottery from the 1st century AD, also in the shape of a bird.
Always linked to the events of Pavia and its territory is the Longobard Room, where paleochristian silverware is exhibited (including a liturgical spoon, a bowl and a chalice knot found between the presbytery and the side aisle of the basilica of San Michele Maggiore in 1968), late Roman and Ostrogothic jevellery (including some notable stirrup fibulae) and finds from the Lombard period (including a rare Lombard age bronze statue representing a warrior), evidence of the importance and splendor of Pavia, then the capital of the kingdom. There are many finds of great interest (including historical ones) preserved: the front of a sarcophagus from the 2nd century AD. it contains an epigraph commemorating the work of the Gothic king Atalaric at the amphitheater of Pavia between 528 and 529. At the same time there is also a funerary epigraph in marble and written in Greek by a Syriac family, coming from the church of San Giovanni in Borgo and some fragments of tiles bearing the bishop Crispinus II (521- 541) stamp, proof of the presence of kilns in the city even after the end of the Roman world. 

In the room there is also the large marble tombstone, found in Villaregio in the nineteenth century, by the philosopher Severino Boethius (about 480 - 524 or 526), and the tombstones of King Cunipert, his daughter Cuniperga, Queen Ragintruda and Duke Audoald. Witnesses of Lombard sculpture at the time of King Liutprand are the well-known plutei of Theodota, which depict the tree of life between winged dragons and a chalice flanked by peacocks, and the fragment of pluteus with a lamb's head from the former Royal Palace of Corteolona, while always linked to the royal past of Pavia is the inscription of the sarcophagus of Queen Ada (wife of King Hugh of Italy, who died in 931 and buried in the church of San Gervasio and Protasio) and the sella plicatilis, a folding chair of Carolingian or Ottonian art in iron coated with silver and gilded copper, a rare specimen (very few European museums retain furnishings from that era and almost none of them reach the quality of the Pavia specimen) due to its technical complexity and refined decoration.

Romanesque and Renaissance section 

The artistic and architectural evolution of the city is represented in the rooms ranging from the 7th to the 14th, where Romanesque, Gothic and Renaissance sculptural and architectural finds are preserved, in particular the Romanesque section is probably one of the largest in northern Italy. Many of them come from buildings destroyed during the nineteenth century, such as those from the churches of Santa Maria del Popolo and Santo Stefano (from the twelfth century and demolished during the nineteenth century to make room for the Cathedral). In particular, the monumental portals of the two churches (room VIII and X), numerous capitals and a portion of the wall with white, green and blue glazed bricks from Santa Maria del Popolo (11th Century) are exhibited, among the oldest Italian (and European) examples of majolica.  Also from Santa Maria del Popolo also come some capitals (11th and 12th century) that reflect the decorations and the shape of the Corinthian capitals of the classical age and a capital represented and seven figures that hold the character in the center, while the last of the series respectively carry a cross and a knife.

The most important Romanesque sculptures are also kept in the tenth room: those from the church of San Giovanni in Borgo (also demolished in the nineteenth century to enlarge the garden of the Borromeo College), among which we remember a capital with dragons and telamon and a capital with dragons bitten by masks, the work of the so-called Master of Dragons, all dating back to the early decades of the 12th century.

Of particular interest are the numerous dishes on display, all important products from the Islamic and Byzantine East, which adorned the facades of churches and buildings (many are still found on the facades of Romanesque churches in Pavia, so much so that Pavia, after Pisa and Rome is the Italian city that retains the largest number). These were very expensive and valuable products and were made with techniques then unknown in the West. Also of oriental origin are other contemporary finds, such as an 11th-century Islamic coffin in embossed foil (coming from Dagestan) from the church of San Teodoro. Along with the sculptural finds, some Romanesque mosaics (12th century) from the churches of Santa Maria del Popolo, Sant'Invenzio and Santa Maria delle Stuoie (the wheel of the months) are preserved in the 11th room. The mosaics of Santa Maria del Popolo were found in successive phases in the demolitions of 1854 and 1936. The floor mosaic of the central nave adapts the theme of a large wheel included within a frame bordered by ribbon, herringbone and, laterally, with geometric motifs. The struggle between Faith and Discord is depicted in the larger band, as indicated by the Latin captions that still mark the wolf and the crow. The mosaic of the right aisle instead depicts scenes of the martyrdom of Saint Eustace and is also notable for the iconographic rarity (the saint's passion is depicted in the capitals of the church of Vezelay in Burgundy, in the cloister of Monreale, but this one in Pavia would be the only mosaic example).
Of particular interest is a homogeneous series of capitals in red Verona marble decorated with foliage and heads, of fine workmanship and expression of Lombard late Gothic sculpture (late 14th century). The perpetual demolitions and demolitions of the urban building fabric have given the museum an impressive number of architectural terracottas; therefore the individual pieces are indicative of their relevance to string courses, windows, portals and, according to the style requirements, to a renewal that the city experienced above all in the Visconti and Sforza age, when alongside the large public buildings and noble palaces, even the small owners came updating their homes to the new taste. Beyond the possible restitution of some context, the same quality is a significant datum of a paleo-industrial production that the documented existence of kilns, starting from the first half of the fourteenth century, can assign to Pavia. The tombstone of Ardengo Folperti (minister of Filippo Maria Visconti who died in 1430), attributed to Jacopino da Tradate and the funerary epigraph of Francesco da Brossano (grandson of Francis Petrarch who died at an early age in Pavia, also date back to the same period. who was buried in the church of San Zeno). In particular, the Folperti slab must have constituted the lid of the sarcophagus of a more complex monument, while the epigraph of Francesco da Brossano is characterized by the refinement of the Gothic characters, elegantly engraved and gilded, accompanying the importance of the poetic text, in elegiac couplets, dictated by Petrarch himself.
Rich is also the Renaissance Section which preserves works of art from the Certosa construction site (in particular many terracotta sculptures) and sculptural testimonies attributed to the school of Giovanni Antonio Amadeo and Cristoforo and Antonio Mantegazza, active in the decoration of the Certosa facade: including the panel with the Annunciation from the monastery of San Salvatore, with evident Bramante influences, and the aedicule with the Pietà, once stuck in the outer wall of the San Matteo Hospital or the telamon bust attributed to Annibale Fontana.

Museum of the Risorgimento 

The Museum of the Risorgimento was established by the municipality in 1885, initially thanks to the numerous bequests of citizens who, for various reasons, participated in the Risorgimento epic, and left documents, books, photographs, weapons and objects to the newborn museum. The museum itinerary is divided into three rooms: the first room covers the period from the years of Maria Theresa of Austria to the Kingdom of Lombardy–Venetia, dedicating particular space to the social, economic and cultural life of Pavia, to the liveliness of the university, also collecting materials of previous age, such as a seal of the municipality of Pavia of the sixteenth century. The second room is entirely dedicated to the Cairoli family, while the third room exhibits weapons and uniforms (Austrian, Piedmontese and French) from the Risorgimento period and dedicates space to the figure of Garibaldi and Benedetto Cairoli.

Other collections 

The museum also collects other collections, such as that of Luigi Robecchi Bricchetti, engineer and explorer from Pavia, who donated to the museum in 1926 numerous artifacts collected by him in Africa and that of Numismatics, formed above all thanks to important bequests, such as the collection of Camillo Brambilla, which has about 50,000 coins and covers a chronological period between the classical Greek issues and the minting of the modern period, with particular wealth for the sector relating to medieval and modern coins and coins issued by the Pavia mint.

Pinacoteca Malaspina 
The Malaspina art gallery has its core in the donation of the Marquis Malaspina; it was expanded with subsequent donations from various entities and personalities, such as Brambilla and Radlinski. In 2001 the art gallery was enriched by the legacy of the Pavia collectors Carla and Giulio Morone, the donation consists of 66 works, including paintings, pastels and drawings by Italian artists such as Federico Zandomeneghi, Giovanni Segantini, Plino Nomellini, Giuseppe de Nittis, Luigi Conconi, Daniele Ranzoni, Tranquillo Cremona, Giovanni Boldini, Giuseppe Pellizza da Volpedo, Vittore Grubicy de Dragon, Carlo Fornara, Oreste Albertini and many others. Inside the picture gallery there are also many examples of Pavia majolica, the city in fact, between the sixteenth and eighteenth centuries, was one of the main centers of majolica production in northern Italy.

In one room there is the rare wooden model of the Cathedral from 1497, the work of Giovanni Pietro Fugazza and Cristoforo Rocchi, one of the few Renaissance wooden models that have survived.

The Pinacoteca Malaspina and the collections of paintings until 1800 include the following works:

References

Bibliography 
 Musei Civici di Pavia, Milano, Skira, 2017.
 Musei civici di Pavia: Pavia longobarda e capitale di regno: secoli VI- X, a cura di Saverio Lomartire, Davide Tolomelli, Milano, Skira, 2017.
 Pavia visconteo-sforzesca : il Castello, la città, la Certosa, a cura di Davide Tolomelli, Milano, Skira, 2016.
 La Pinacoteca Malaspina, a cura di Susanna Zatti, Milano, Skira, 2011.
 La collezione di impronte glittiche del marchese Luigi Malaspina di Sannazzaro: Musei civici di Pavia, Sezione arti minori, a cura di Carlamaria Tomaselli, Pisa, ETS, 2006.
 Andrea Mantegna e l'incisione italiana del Rinascimento nelle collezioni dei Musei civici di Pavia: Pavia, Castello Visconteo, 15 novembre 2003-15 gennaio 2004, a cura di Saverio Lomartire, Corbetta, Il Guado, 2003.
 La collezione Morone, a cura di Susanna Zatti, Milano, Skira, 2002.
 La quadreria dell'Ottocento, a cura di Susanna Zatti, Milano, Skira, 2002.
 Novella Vismara, Le collezioni numismatiche dei Civici Musei di Pavia, Como, Litografia New Press, 1994.
 Claudia Maccabruni, I vetri romani dei Musei civici di Pavia: lettura di una collezione, Pavia, Ticinum, 1983.
 Il castello visconteo di Pavia e i suoi musei: guida, a cura di Donata Vicini, Logos international, in collaborazione con il Comune di Pavia, Assessorato alla cultura, 1984.

External links
Official site for Musei Civici Pavia.
Lombardia Beni Culturali – Castello Visconteo – Pavia

Museums in Pavia
Archaeological museums in Italy
Art museums and galleries in Lombardy
Decorative arts museums in Italy
Egyptological collections in Italy